PAA may refer to:

Businesses and organizations
 Pacific American Airlines
 Pamoja African Alliance, a Kenyan political party
 PanAfrican Archaeological Association
 Pan African Association
 Pan American World Airways, commonly known as Pan Am
 Pan American Association of Anatomy
 Pittsburgh Athletic Association, athletic and social club
 Polish American Association
 Population Association of America, dedicated to population and demography studies
 Portland Adventist Academy, an Adventist High School

Science, technology and mathematics

Chemistry and materials science
 Peroxyacetic acid, a chemical
 Phenylacetic acid, a chemical
 Phosphoamino acid analysis, a biochemistry technique
 Polyacrylamide, an acrylate polymer
 Polyacrylic acid, an acrylic polymer
 Primary Aromatic Amine, a group of compounds

Electronic devices
 Personal Attack Alarm
 Piezo Audio Amplifier

Linguistics
 Proto-Afroasiatic language
 Proto-Austroasiatic language

Statistics
 , dimension reduction method

Legislation
 Perpetuities and Accumulations Act 1964, UK act of Parliament
 Perpetuities and Accumulations Act 2009, UK act of Parliament
 Protect America Act of 2007, amendment to the US Foreign Intelligence Surveillance Act

Other uses
 Penny Arcade Adventures, video game series
 Prueba de Aptitud Académica, standardized test for university admissions

See also
 Paa (disambiguation)